Miranda Carter (born 1965) is an English historian, writer and biographer who also publishes fiction under the name MJ Carter.

Education
Carter was educated at St Paul's Girls School and Exeter College, Oxford.

Career
Carter's first book was a biography of the art historian and spy Anthony Blunt, entitled Anthony Blunt: His Lives. It won the Royal Society of Literature Award and the Orwell Prize and was short-listed for the CWA Gold Dagger for Non-Fiction, the Guardian First Book Award, the Whitbread Prize for Best Biography, and the James Tait Black Memorial Prize. In the US it was chosen by the New York Times Book Review as one of seven best books selected by the Times' editors for 2002. Noted the editors, "It's an unusual achievement: Miranda Carter's biography of Anthony Blunt is more interesting than the man."

Her second historical undertaking was The Three Emperors, which was a group biography of Kaiser Wilhelm II, Tsar Nicholas II and King George V, all world leaders during the First World War.

Carter also has written several novels, notably The Strangler Vine and its sequel The Infidel Stain, which was later republished as The Printer's Coffin. Her third mystery is entitled The Devil's Feast. All three are Victorian detective and mystery stories.

Personal life
Carter is married to John Lanchester, with whom she has two children, and lives in London.

Accolades
2010 Los Angeles Times Book Prize (Biography), The Three Emperors: Three Cousins, Three Empires and the Road to World War One, shortlist
2002 Whitbread Biography Award, Anthony Blunt: His Lives, shortlist
2002 The Royal Society of Literature Award, Anthony Blunt: His Lives
2002 Orwell Prize, Anthony Blunt: His Lives
2002 James Tait Black Memorial Prize (for biography), Anthony Blunt: His Lives, shortlist
2002 Duff Cooper Prize, Anthony Blunt: His Lives, shortlist
2002 Crime Writers' Association Silver Dagger for Non-Fiction, Anthony Blunt: His Lives, shortlist
2001 Guardian First Book Award, Anthony Blunt: His Lives, shortlist

Bibliography

Non-fiction
Anthony Blunt: His Lives.  London, Macmillan. 2001. 
The Three Emperors: Three cousins, Three Empires and the Road to World War One. London, Penguin. 2009.

Avery & Blake Series
The Strangler Vine. London, Fig Tree. 2014. 
The Infidel Stain [or] The Printer's Coffin. London, Fig Tree. 2015. 
The Devil's Feast. London, Fig Tree. 2016.

References

External links
 Official website

1965 births
Living people
Alumni of Exeter College, Oxford
English biographers
English non-fiction writers
Fellows of the Royal Society of Literature
People educated at St Paul's Girls' School
Writers from London
Women biographers
English women non-fiction writers
21st-century English women writers
21st-century biographers
James Tait Black Memorial Prize recipients